This is an episode list for the Canadian TV show Blue Murder. The show aired its pilot on January 10, 2001 and ended its four-year run on July 9, 2004.

The show centered on the fictitious Blue Murder Unit of the Toronto Police Department. Cases usually involved murders, kidnapping or other violent offenses.

The show has been broadcast in the UK on the Hallmark Channel.

Series overview

Episodes

Season 1 (2001)

Season 2 (2001–02)

Season 3 (2003)

Season 4 (2004)

External links
 
 

Lists of crime drama television series episodes
Lists of crime television series episodes
Lists of Canadian television series episodes
Lists of Canadian drama television series episodes